Punyakante Wijenaike (born Colombo, 1933- 8th March 2023) was a Sri Lankan writer. She has been described as "one of the most underestimated fiction writers currently at work in the English language."

Work
Wijenaike writes primarily in English, including fiction, short stories and anthologies. Her first collection of short stories, The Third Woman, was published in 1963. Since then she has published four collections of short stories and six novels, with more than 100 stories published in newspapers, journals and anthologies in Sri Lanka and abroad, and has had her works broadcast in Sri Lanka and on the BBC.

Although she has spent most of her life in Colombo, she initially used rural villages as her theme, only later turning to urban themes. Her writings highlight "the tyranny of community or a group towards its weaker members." Her 1998 novel, An Enemy within, uncovers "the mask that tend to hide the reality of present times."

Her novel Giraya was adapted into a teledrama by Independent Television Network of Sri Lanka.

Awards and recognition
Women of Achievement Award, 1985 
Kala Suri Class 1 (literary achievement), conferred by the Government of Sri Lanka, 1988 
 1994 Gratiaen Prize for her novel Amulet 
 1996, joint winner of the Commonwealth Short Story Competition for Radio

Ten of her works are held by the U.S. Library of Congress.

Books

Novels
1998: An Enemy Within, uncovers
2011: Giraya
      Amulet
      The Waiting Earth
2010: When Guns Fall Silent
      The Rebel
2009: That deep silence
      To Follow the Sun
      Unbinding: A Story of Rebirth and Other Stories
      Anoma
1972: The Betel Wine

Short stories
2004: Missing in Action;Sunset Years
1963: The Third Women

Personal life
She is the daughter of Justin Kotelawala, a businessman and senator of Colombo and his wife Millicent da Silva. Her brother is Deshamanya Lalith Kotelawala. She spent most of her life in Colombo, where she published all her works.

References

External links
http://www.loc.gov/acq/ovop/delhi/salrp/punyakantewijenaike.html
https://prezi.com/otgp8p9cvhxy/punyakante-wijenaike-anoma/

People from Colombo
1933 births
Living people
20th-century Sri Lankan writers
20th-century Sri Lankan women writers
21st-century Sri Lankan writers
21st-century Sri Lankan women writers